Art of Sleeping are an Australian rock band.

History 
In 2012, the band released the singles "Empty Hands" and "Above the Water".
 
In September 2012, the band signed with Dew Process and released their debut EP Like a Thief on 12 October 2012. The EP peaked at number 95 on the ARIA charts.

The band released "Crazy" on 8 December 2014. followed by "Voodoo" in May 2015.
 
The group recorded "around 50" songs for their debut album. In November 2015, Jarryd Shuker said "The five of us got together one night, we drank beer and we ate good food, and we refined that list. We argued and laughed, and we got to a point where we were all mutually happy." The finished product was Shake Shiver which was released in July 2015.

Members 

Caleb Hodges – vocals & guitars
Jarryd Shuker - keyboards
Francois Malengret - bass
Jean-Paul Malengret - drums
Patrick Silver - guitars

Discography

Studio albums

Extended Plays

Singles

Other charted and certified songs

References

Universal Music Group artists
Musical groups established in 2012
Musical groups from Brisbane